The main article would exceed space guidelines if all winners and nominees were listed on that page, so winners and nominees for years prior to 2000 are listed here.

1976–77 Winners and nominees 
Sources:

Sources:

1977–78 Winners and nominees 
Sources:

Sources:

1978–79 Winners and nominees 
Sources:

Sources:

1979–80 Winners and nominees 
Sources:

Sources:

1980–81 Winners and nominees 
Sources:

Sources:

1981–82 Winners and nominees 
Sources:

Sources:

1982–83 Winners and nominees 
Sources:

Sources:

1983–84 Winners and nominees 
Sources:

Sources:

1984–85 Winners and nominees 
Sources:

Sources:

1985–86 Winners and nominees 
Sources:

Sources:

1986–87 Winners and nominees 
Sources:

Sources:

1987–88 Winners and nominees 
Sources:

Sources:

1988–89 Winners and nominees 
Sources:

Sources:

1989–90 Winners and nominees 
Sources:

Sources:

1990–91 Winners and nominees 
Sources:

Sources:

1991–92 Winners and nominees 
Sources:

Sources:

1992–93 Winners and nominees 
Sources:

Sources:

1993–94 Winners and nominees 
Sources:

Sources:

1994–95 Winners and nominees 
Sources:

Sources:

1995–96 Winners and nominees 
Sources:

Sources:

1996–97 Winners and nominees 
Sources:

Sources:

1997–98 Winners and nominees 
Sources:

Sources:

1998–99 Winners and nominees 
Sources:

Sources:

1999–00 Winners and nominees 
Sources:

Sources:

References

External links
Honda Award official website

College sports trophies and awards in the United States
Sports awards honoring women
Women's sports in the United States
Honda
Sportsmanship trophies and awards
Awards established in 1976